Hans Hermannstädter (6 February 1918 – 30 December 2006) was a Romanian field handball player who competed in the 1936 Summer Olympics.

A Transylvanian Saxon, Hermannstädter was born in Neustadt near Kronstadt, Burzenland. He was part of the Romanian field handball team, which finished fifth in the Olympic tournament. He played one match. He died in Augsburg, Germany.

External links
 Johann Steiner, "Geschichten rund um den Handball in Siebenbürgen" (XX), in Siebenbürgische Zeitung, February 2002 
 Hannes Schuster, "Hans Hermannstädter: Leben im Dienst am Menschen und an der Gemeinschaft", in Siebenbürgische Zeitung, January 2007 

1918 births
2006 deaths
Field handball players at the 1936 Summer Olympics
Romanian people of German descent
Olympic handball players of Romania
Romanian male handball players
Transylvanian Saxon people
Romanian emigrants to Germany